The Oak Hill is a historic plantation house located at Colonial Heights, Virginia. It was built in 1825–1826, and is a one-story, frame dwelling with Greek Revival style interior decorative details.  It originally had an "H" shape, but was subsequently expanded with several additions.  It features a distinctive elongated octagonal wing at the west end, inspired by nearby Violet Bank.

It was listed on the National Register of Historic Places in 1974.

References

External links
Oak Hill, 151 Carroll Avenue, Colonial Heights, Colonial Heights, VA: 6 photos and 2 data pages at Historic American Buildings Survey

Plantation houses in Virginia
Historic American Buildings Survey in Virginia
Houses on the National Register of Historic Places in Virginia
Houses completed in 1826
Greek Revival houses in Virginia
Houses in Colonial Heights, Virginia
National Register of Historic Places in Colonial Heights, Virginia
1826 establishments in Virginia